Sebastiania schottiana is a species of flowering plant in the family Euphorbiaceae. It was originally described as Gymnanthes schottiana Müll.Arg. in 1863. It is native from Brazil to northeastern Argentina.

References

Plants described in 1863
Flora of Argentina
Flora of Brazil
schottiana